is a Japanese television and radio presenter, journalist, author, and goodwill ambassador for Germany. He is the host of the TBS radio talk show Kume Hiroshi Radio Nandesukedo.

From 1978 to 1985, he served as host of pop music show The Best Ten. From October 1985 to March 2004, he was the anchor for TV Asahi's news program News Station.

Biography
Kume was born on July 14, 1944 in Urawa, Saitama, which is now part of the city of Saitama. He has three sisters, and he is the youngest child of an engineer working for Japanese National Railways and Toshiba Corporation. After World War II ended, he was moved to Shinagawa, Tokyo, where he was raised.

He loved watching radio and TV programs in his early years. Kokontei Shinshō, a prominent rakugo storyteller, was one of the personality he admired.

Education
He studied politics and economics at Waseda University from 1963, graduating in 1967.

Career

TBS
After Kume graduated from Waseda University in 1967, he started his broadcasting career at TBS as an announcer at age 22. His hard work at that time led him to be suffered from tuberculosis. 

In April 1970, he became Friday's personality for Back In Music, but five weeks later he retired from it because of illness.

From May 1970, he was a correspondent for the radio program Rokusuke Ei Presents Saturday Wide Radio Tokyo.

In 1975, Kinichi Hagimoto, one of Japan's most notable TV personalities, recommended Kume as the host of the quiz show Pittashi Kan Kan he also starred. This program was broadcast nationwide, and it helped him to be one of Japan's famous TV personalities.

The Best Ten
In 1978, Kume became the first host of the pop music show The Best Ten with Tetsuko Kuroyanagi. It was a weekly live music program where top ten artists chosen by viewers' polls appeared and sang on stage, with 41.9% of highest viewership rate. Because this program became very popular, he was confident to be a freelance announcer. In June 1979, he left TBS at age 34. As a freelance announcer, he still was a host of this program until it ended in April 1985.

Career as a freelance announcer
In April 1980, he was the host for Nippon Television's talk show Oshare until March 1987. In 1982, Kume became the host for infotainment variety program Hiroshi Kume presents TV Scramble with the comedian Yasushi Yokoyama.

News Station
Kume was the news anchor on TV Asahi's national evening news program News Station from its start on 7 October 1985 until it ended on 26 March 2004 and was replaced by Hōdō Station. The show revolutionized news reporting in Japan and achieved an average of 20 million viewers each night.

Return to TBS Radio
In September 2006, he returned to his roots in radio to host a two-hour Saturday show Kume Hiroshi Radio Nandesukedo on TBS Radio, which, as of August 2019, he still presents.

As of June 2011, he also presents the weekly TV show Hiroshi Kume's Terebitte Yatsu wa? alongside Akiko Yagi, broadcast on the Mainichi Broadcasting System (MBS) network.

Political stance
Kume says that he is against any ruling party, with his belief that the mass media should keep a distance from the ruling party. 

Kume has been critical of Japan's public broadcaster NHK, and he rarely appears on NHK's programs, with a few exceptions that he starred NHK's variety and talk shows by request of Kinichi Hagimoto and Yasushi Akimoto.

When Kume appeared NHK's live infotainment program Asaichi hosted by Yurie Omi on July 19, 2019, he blistered NHK severely, saying, "I think NHK should turn into a private broadcasting company. It should be an independent broadcasting organization. There shouldn't be such a broadcasting station got by the balls by the state with its power on personnel affairs and budget. Such a thing should never happen in a developed country." Omi talked back to him on behalf of NHK, saying, "You're saying NHK is got by the balls by the state, but it's an independent public broadcasting station, not state-run broadcasting. As a worker for NHK, I'll do my best for not playing up to anybody." The next day when Kume was talking on Kume Hiroshi Radio Nandesukedo about the progress of Asaichi on the day before, Omi sent an email to the radio station incognito, saying that she was ashamed to be aggressive to him, just like a chihuahua barking at a bigger Doberman.

Personal life
In 2011, it was reported that Kume had donated 200 million yen to an earthquake relief fund following the March 2011 Great Eastern Japan Earthquake Disaster.

Awards
 1983—Golden Microphone Award from TBS Radio for his contribution to Saturday Wide Radio Tokyo
 1990—Galaxy Award from the Japan Council for Better Radio and Television for his contribution to News Station

Works

Books
 , Seishun, 1978
 , Keibunsha, January 1984, 
 , Seishun Super Books, September 1997, 
 , Shueisha, April 1999, 
 , Sekaibunka, March 2001,

References

External links
  
 Office Two-One agency profile 
 

1944 births
Living people
Japanese journalists
Japanese television personalities
Japanese radio personalities
People from Saitama (city)
People from Shinagawa
Japanese broadcast news analysts
Waseda University alumni